Al-Muqawqis ("the Caucasian") is mentioned in Islamic history as a ruler of Egypt who corresponded with the Islamic prophet Muhammad. He is widely identified with the last prefect of Egypt. Cyrus of Alexandria, who was the  Greek (Melchite) patriarch of the second Byzantine period of Egypt (628-642). However, an alternative view identifies al-Muqawqis with the Sassanid governor of Egypt, said to be a Greek man named "Kirolos, leader of the Copts," although the Sassanian governor at the time was the military leader named Shahrbaraz.

Account by Muslim historians

Ibn Ishaq and other Muslim historians record that sometime between February 628 and 632, Muhammad sent epistles to the political heads of Medina's neighboring regions, both of Arabia and of the non-Arab lands of the Near East, including al-Muqawqis:

Tabari states that the delegation was sent in Dhul-Hijja 6 A.H. (April or May 628). Ibn Saad states that the Muqawqis sent his gifts to Muhammad in 7 A.H. (after May 628). This is consistent with his assertion that Mariya bore Muhammad's son Ibrahim in late March or April 630, so Mariya had arrived in Medina before July 629.

Letter of invitation to Islam

The epistle that Muhammad sent to al-Muqawqis, through his emissary Hatib ibn Abi Balta'ah, and his reply are both available. The letter reads as follows:

 The epistle was signed with the seal of Muhammad.

Al-Muqawqis ordered that the letter be placed in an ivory casket, to be kept safely in the government treasury. The letter was found in an old Christian monastery among Coptic books in the town of Akhmim, Egypt and now resides in the Topkapi Palace Museum (Department of Holy Relics) after the Turkish Sultan Abdülmecid I brought it to Istanbul. Al-Muqawqis is said to have replied with a letter that read:

 

The two slave-girls mentioned are Maria, whom Muhammad himself married, and her sister Shirin whom he married to Hassan ibn Thabit.

It is said that a recluse in the monastery pasted it on his Bible and from there a French orientalist obtained it and sold it to  the Sultan for £300.  Authenticity of the preserved samples and of the elaborate accounts by the medieval Islamic historians regarding the events surrounding the letter has also been questioned by modern historians.

Dialog with Mughira ibn Shu'ba
According to another account, Al-Muqawqis also had a dialogue with Mughira ibn Shu'ba, before Mughira became a Muslim. Mughira said:

Regarding al-Muqawqis' behavior in Islamic traditions, it is of note that when the general of the Arab conquest of Egypt 'Amr ibn al-'As (known to the East Romans as "Amru") threatened the Prefecture of Egypt, Cyrus of Alexandria as prefect was entrusted with the conduct of the war. Certain humiliating stipulations, to which he subscribed for the sake of peace, angered his imperial master so much that he was recalled and harshly accused of connivance with the Saracens. However, he was soon restored to his former authority owing to the impending siege of Alexandria, but could not avert the fall of the city in 640. He signed a peace treaty that surrendered Alexandria and Egypt on 8 November 641 before dying in 642.

Explanation of the name
The word muqawqis is the Arabized form of Coptic ⲡⲓⲕⲁⲩⲕⲟⲥ pi-kaukos (alternatively ⲡⲭⲁⲩⲕⲓⲁⲛⲟⲥ p-khaukianos), meaning "the Caucasian," the common epithet among the non-Chalcedonian Copts of Egypt for the Melchite (Chalcedonian) patriarch Cyrus, who was seen as the corrupter and foreign usurper to the throne of the Coptic patriarch Benjamin I. The word was subsequently used by Arab writers for some other patriarchs in Alexandria such as George I of Alexandria ("Jurayj ibn Mīnā" Georgios son of Menas Parkabios; alternatively, "Jurayj ibn Mattá"), Cyrus' predecessor. According to the opponents of the identification of al-Muqawqis as Cyrus and advocates of the view that he was rather the governor of Sassanid Egypt, the Arabic name referred to the inhabitants of a Persian empire that extended all the way to the Caucasus.

Opposition to identification with Cyrus of Alexandria
The widely held view of identifying al-Muqawqis with Cyrus has been challenged by some as being based on untenable assumptions. Considering historical facts, the opponents of the identification point out that Cyrus did not succeed to the See of Alexandria until 630 AD, after Heraclius had recaptured Egypt. After the Persian invasion, "The Coptic patriarch Andronicus remained in the country, experiencing and witnessing suffering as a result of the occupation (Evetts, 1904, p. 486, lines 8-11). His successor in 626, Benjamin I, remained in office well beyond the end of the occupation; during his time the Sassanians moderated their policy to a certain extent."

Adherents to this state that al-Muqawqis was not a Christian patriarch but the Persian governor during the last days of the Persian occupation of Egypt. There must have been an abundance of Alexandrine women left after the massacre. "Severus b. al-Moqaffa...also reported that in Alexandria every man between the ages of eighteen and fifty years had been brutally massacred (Evetts, 1904, p. 485, line 10; p. 486 line 3)." So from among the captive women, it seems that al-Muqawqis took two Coptic sisters and sent them to Muhammad as gifts, realizing that the Byzantines were gaining ground and would soon re-take Alexandria. One possible reason that the Sasanian governor was kind towards Muhammad is that it is alleged that Christian Arabs assisted in Persian victory over the Byzantine Empire, and al-Muqawqis simply wanted to reward Muhammad whom he saw as one of the Arab kings. "According to a Nestorian Syriac chronicle attributed to Elias, bishop of Merv (?), Alexandria was taken by treachery. The traitor was a Christian Arab who came from the Sassanian-controlled northeastern coast of Arabia."

Film and television depictions
 Al-Muqawqis was portrayed by Egyptian actor Salah Zulfikar in Muhammad, Messenger of Allah to the World, TV series aired on Egyptian TV in 1993.

References

7th-century Islam
Muslim conquest of Egypt
7th-century Egyptian people
Egyptian people of Greek descent